Vitaliy Pryndeta (born 2 February 1993) is a Ukrainian professional footballer who plays as a midfielder for Kazakh side Kaisar.

Career
Pryndeta began his playing career with FC BRV-VIK Volodymyr-Volynskyi youth team. Than in age 15 he joined FC Volyn Lutsk in the Ukrainian First League. He made his first team debut entering as a second-half substitute against PFC Sevastopol on 17 August 2008.

From 2008, Pryndeta was called up to the different Ukraine national youth football teams.

Desna Chernihiv
In summer 2019 he signed for Desna Chernihiv.

Honours
Akzhayik
 Kazakhstan Cup: runner-up: 2022

References

External links

 Profile at Official club site 
 

1993 births
Living people
People from Dubno
Ukrainian footballers
FC Volyn Lutsk players
Ukrainian Premier League players
Platanias F.C. players
Ukrainian expatriate footballers
Expatriate footballers in Greece
Ukrainian expatriate sportspeople in Greece
Association football midfielders
PAS Lamia 1964 players
Expatriate footballers in Russia
Ukrainian expatriate sportspeople in Russia
Expatriate footballers in Kazakhstan
Ukrainian expatriate sportspeople in Kazakhstan
FC SKA-Khabarovsk players
FC Desna Chernihiv players
FC Akzhayik players
Ukraine youth international footballers
Ukraine under-21 international footballers
Sportspeople from Rivne Oblast